Tower of Set is a  summit located in the Grand Canyon, in Coconino County of Arizona, US. Tower of Set was originally named Temple of Sett in 1879 by Thomas Moran, for the Egyptian deity of war, Set, because a niche worn into its wall evoked temples in the valley of the Nile. Another source states it was named by George Wharton James, in keeping with Clarence Dutton's tradition of naming geographical features in the Grand Canyon after mythological deities. This mountain's name was officially adopted in 1906 by the U.S. Board on Geographic Names. In 1919, Harriet Williams Russell Strong proposed connecting Hopi Point and Tower of Set across the river via an aerial tramway, an idea that never came to fruition. The first ascent was made in November 1977 by Bruce Grubbs and Jim Haggart. According to the Köppen climate classification system, Tower of Set is located in a cold semi-arid climate zone.

Geology

The top of Tower of Set is composed of the reddish Pennsylvanian-Permian Supai Group. Further down are strata of Mississippian Redwall Limestone, the Cambrian Tonto Group, and finally granite of the Paleoproterozoic Vishnu Basement Rocks at river level. Precipitation runoff from Tower of Set drains due-south to the Colorado River via Trinity Creek (east), and Ninetyfour Mile Creek (west).

See also
 Geology of the Grand Canyon area

Gallery

References

External links 

 Weather forecast: National Weather Service
 Tower of Set photo by Harvey Butchart

Grand Canyon
Landforms of Coconino County, Arizona
Mountains of Arizona
Mountains of Coconino County, Arizona
Colorado Plateau
Grand Canyon National Park
Buttes of Arizona
Set (deity)